Dangerous is the eighth studio album by the American singer-songwriter Michael Jackson. It was released by Epic Records on November 26, 1991, more than four years after Jackson's previous album, Bad (1987). Co-produced by Jackson, Bill Bottrell, Teddy Riley, and Bruce Swedien, the album was Jackson's first since  Forever, Michael (1975) without longtime collaborator Quincy Jones. Guest appearances include Heavy D, Princess Stéphanie of Monaco, Slash and Wreckx-n-Effect. The album incorporates R&B, pop and new jack swing, a growing genre at the time. Elements of industrial, funk, hip hop, electronic, gospel, classical and rock are also present. Twelve of the album's fourteen songs were written or co-written by Jackson, discussing topics like racism, poverty, romance, self-improvement, and the welfare of children and the world.

Dangerous is considered an artistic change for Jackson, with his music focusing on more socially conscious material, and including a broader range of sounds and styles. It features catchy pop hooks and choruses while also introducing underground sounds to a mainstream audience. The album's tone is noted by critics as gritty and urban, with sounds including synthetic basslines, scratching, and drum machine percussion, as well as unconventional sounds like honking vehicle horns, sliding chains, swinging gates, breaking glass, and clanking metal. Jackson also incorporates beatboxing, scat singing, and finger snapping throughout the album.

Dangerous debuted at number one on the US Billboard Top Pop Albums chart and in thirteen other countries, selling 5 million copies worldwide in its first week and went on to be the best-selling album worldwide of 1992. Nine singles premiered between November 1991 and December 1993, including one exclusively released outside North America ("Give In to Me"). The album produced four singles that reached the top ten of the US Billboard Hot 100: "Remember the Time", "In the Closet", "Will You Be There" and the number-one single "Black or White". The Dangerous World Tour grossed $100 million (equivalent to $177 million in 2019), making it one of the highest-grossing tours of the 1990s.

Dangerous is one of the best-selling albums of all time, having sold over 32 million copies worldwide, and was certified 8× Platinum by the Recording Industry Association of America (RIAA) in August 2018. Dangerous received worldwide appraisal, and it influenced contemporary pop and R&B artists. It has been included in several publications' lists of the greatest albums of all time. At the 1993 Grammy Awards, it received four Grammy Award nominations, winning Best Engineered Album, Non-Classical, while Jackson was awarded the Grammy Legend Award. Jackson won three American Music Awards at the 1993 American Music Awards, including the inaugural International Artist Award. Jackson also received Billboard Music Awards for Best Worldwide Album and Best Worldwide Single for "Black or White".

Background 
After the success of his seventh album, Bad (1987), Jackson wanted more independence and control over the creative process. He separated himself from longtime producer Quincy Jones to avoid the perception that his success depended on him. Jackson began working on new tracks in 1989 with a handful of members from the B-team of Bad, including Matt Forger and Bill Bottrell. The album was conceived as a greatest-hits collection, Decade, with a handful of new songs, similar to Madonna's The Immaculate Collection. Jackson signed off on the idea in early 1989 and test pressings were made by Epic Records. Jackson received $18 million in advance.

Decade was scheduled for a late 1989 release but was delayed several times. Another release date was set for November 1990, but it never materialized. Jackson was preoccupied with ongoing changes in his management team while also attempting to realize his film-making ambitions. In June 1990, he collapsed while dancing in his home studio due to a possible panic attack, with symptoms of chest pains, dehydration and inflammation of the ribs. Soon after, Decade was dropped entirely, and Jackson determined that his new material constituted a full album, which he called Dangerous.

Recording 

For nearly two years starting in late 1989, recording took place primarily at Ocean Way Record One in Sherman Oaks, where Jackson arranged for executive control for $4,000 per day. Most work proceeded with three producers, Bill Bottrell, Bruce Swedien, and Bryan Loren, in three different studios with Jackson. Bottrell co-wrote and produced "Give In to Me" and "Black or White", and received writing credits for "Dangerous" and production credits for "Who Is It". He had been forced out of the production of Bad by Jones, but Jackson brought him back for Dangerous, for which he was known as the "rock guy". Bottrell introduced Jackson to classically trained keyboardist Brad Buxer, who was originally hired as a technician for his expertise in electronic equipment. Buxer recalled: "Musically speaking, we were on the same wavelength; we spoke the same language." The Jackson-Buxer partnership continued for 20 years.

For most of the rhythm tracks, Jackson worked with Loren at Westlake Studios. Their work had begun at the end of Jackson's Bad tour, and together they recorded "Work That Body", "She Got It", "Serious Effect", "Do Not Believe It", "Seven Digits", and "Man in Black". Loren wanted to recapture the organic R&B feeling of Jackson's albums Off the Wall and Thriller. LL Cool J was invited to rap on "Serious Effect" and "Truth About Youth", because Jackson wanted to add hip-hop to the record. LL Cool J had been critical of Jackson but praised him after their collaboration. None of Loren's recordings made the album. Though Loren's material was strong, it was not up to Jackson's standards, and he was searching for a sound as compelling and successful as Rhythm Nation (1989) by his sister Janet Jackson.

Jackson discovered new jack swing, featuring a more aggressive and urban sound, after reaching out to producers Antonio "L.A." Reid and Kenny "Babyface" Edmonds. In June 1990, Jackson hired Teddy Riley, pioneer of the new jack swing genre. By then, Jackson had already recorded over 50 songs. Initially recording at Record One, Riley moved to nearby Larrabee Studios after a few weeks, because other producers were working at Sherman Oaks. Unlike Loren, Riley wanted Dangerous to sound different from Jackson's earlier work, and Jackson admired Riley for bringing in contemporary styles. Jackson challenged Riley to create new instrumentation without relying on stock synth and drum machine sounds. Riley reworked some of Loren's contributions, including "She Got It" and "Serious Effect", and developed "Jam" and "Dangerous" further. "Dangerous" was originally recorded with Bottrell, but Jackson was not satisfied until improvements were made. Riley said he brought Jackson's music back to its "barest forms" of R&B and funk.

By early 1991 Jackson had finished the track list, which included several tracks he recorded with Riley: "Remember the Time", "Dangerous", and "In the Closet". He had planned for "In the Closet" to be a duet with pop singer Madonna, but her half was replaced with Princess Stéphanie of Monaco. A meeting with guitarist Slash took more than a year to co-ordinate, and the two collaborated on "Give In to Me". Swedien recalled recording sessions lasting up to 18 hours. On one occasion, he ordered Jackson not to leave the studio until he sang the vocals for "Keep the Faith" all the way through: "This was scary but he did it. He didn't leave the studio until dawn."

Jackson spent $10 million to record Dangerous. Executives at Epic set a deadline for the album, wanting it released before November 28, 1991, Thanksgiving Day. For the last two months of recording, Jackson and Swedien rented hotel rooms located four minutes from Record One, so they could get back to work as soon as possible. Riley said, "When the deadline came, [Jackson] wanted to do more and more songs. [...] And then when Michael saw the commercial for Dangerous, the David Lynch thing, we started working hard to get it finished." Dangerous was completed and mastered, by Bernie Grundman, on Halloween, 1991.

Jackson recorded roughly 60 to 70 songs for Dangerous, some of which were released later, including the environmental anthem "Earth Song", released on his next album, HIStory. "Superfly Sister," "Ghosts" and "Blood on the Dance Floor" were released in the remix compilation Blood on the Dance Floor: HIStory in the Mix. Loren helped develop "Superfly Sister", while Riley worked on "Ghosts" and "Blood on the Dance Floor". "For All Time", a romantic pop ballad that Jackson liked but did not feel it fit Dangerous, was released in the 25th anniversary edition of Thriller. "Slave to the Rhythm" was remastered and released for the 2014 compilation album Xscape. Another Riley outtake, "Joy", featured in Blackstreet's 1994 debut album, which Riley produced.

Composition and lyrics 
Dangerous is a new jack swing, R&B and pop album, which incorporates elements of several other genres, including industrial, funk, hip hop, electronic, gospel, classical, and rock. In a 1992 interview with Ebony magazine, Jackson said, "I wanted to do an album like Tchaikovsky’s Nutcracker Suite. So that in a thousand years from now, people would still be listening to it." Much of the album contains samples from CDs that Riley had created himself using a variety of instruments.

The album features catchy pop hooks and choruses while also introducing underground sounds to a mainstream audience. The album's tone is noted by critics as gritty and urban,  with sounds including synthetic basslines, scratching, and drum machine percussion, as well as unconventional sounds like honking vehicle horns, sliding chains, swinging gates, breaking glass, and clanking metal. Throughout the album Jackson also implements beatboxing, scat singing, and finger snapping. The album is considered by Joe Vogel in PopMatters to be an artistic change for Jackson, because of its focus on socially conscious material, and a broader range of sounds and styles. The car sound effects on "She Drives Me Wild" were taken from a sample CD, and was the first time Riley used unusual sounds in place of the drums on a song.

The album featured Jackson rapping for the first time. The inclusion of Wreckx-n-Effect and hip-hop rhythms were attempts to introduce Jackson to a younger generation of urban listeners. Riley was a pioneer of new jack swing, and he was hired by Jackson specifically for his work in the genre. Riley co-produced half the songs on the album. Swedien said of Riley, "He'd come in with a groove, we'd say it wasn't exactly right, and there would be no complaining. He'd just go back and then come back in and blow us away with something like 'Dangerous'." In recordings with Bottrell, the sounds were more diverse (e.g. "Black or White" and "Give In to Me"). The rap in "Black or White" was written and performed by Bottrell, credited under the pseudonym "L.T.B." Jackson hummed melodies and grooves before leaving the studio, while Bottrell developed on these ideas with drum machines and samplers, including an Akai S1000. Bottrell operated a Neve console and two 24-track Studer analog tape machines to draft ideas and demos. He then used a 32-track Mitsubishi machine to assemble the album.

The lyrics for Dangerous were more varied than those of Jackson's previous records. Opening track "Jam" features a dense, swirling Riley track, propelled by horn samples and a subtle scratch effect. Jackson had recorded a basic idea for the song on a DAT, to which he asked Riley to develop. Riley learned that Heavy D was Jackson's favourite rapper at the time, and suggested that he was brought in to contribute a rap. The ballads, "Keep the Faith" (composed by Jackson, Siedah Garrett and Glen Ballard) and the self-composed "Will You Be There" had sounds of gospel, while "Heal the World" and "Gone Too Soon" were softer pop ballads. "Gone Too Soon", written by Larry Grossman and Buz Kohan, is a tribute to Ryan White following his death due to AIDS in 1990. The album also includes songs of other personal nature, especially in songs such as "She Drives Me Wild", "Remember the Time", "Can't Let Her Get Away", "Who Is It" and "Give In to Me". The title track's subject is similar to that of "Dirty Diana" with the song focusing on a seductress. Though Jackson sang about racial harmony in some of his songs with the Jacksons, "Black or White" was the first song where the lyrics were interpreted with the context of his own changing skin color. In "Why You Wanna Trip on Me," Jackson juxtaposed social ills to his own alleged eccentricities that were covered in the press at the time, asking critics and the tabloid media why they were focusing on the cult of celebrity rather than the multitude of serious problems in the world. Riley performed the guitar parts on an Ovation acoustic, and expected Jackson to have someone brought in to re-record them, but was surprised that Jackson liked what he had put down.

Artwork 
The album's front cover was painted by American pop surrealist artist Mark Ryden. It displays Jackson behind a gold masquerade mask with the face of a chimpanzee (which may be Jackson's pet Bubbles) atop the mask, and a dog and a bird wearing royal clothing sitting on the left and right side, respectively. The forefront depicts P. T. Barnum, the creator of the Barnum and Bailey circus. Ryden had five days to come up with ideas, and "feverishly worked that week" to produce one design per day. He was instructed to focus on Jackson's eyes, include animals and children, and "show the earth at peril". He was also told that his designs "could be scary, but should still be fun". Ryden said the cover was his most exciting project up to that point. In November 2021, the 30th anniversary of Dangerous, Ryden shared his conceptual drawings for the cover on Instagram for the first time. According to Fraser McAlpine of BBC Music, Ryden depicted Jackson as "a guarded circus artist who has seen glory and the machinery involved in making it happen".

Events leading to release 
In November 1991, days before the debut of the music video "Black or White", David Browne of Entertainment Weekly commented on the high expectations of Dangerous, due to the extended time spent on developing the album and Jackson's lucrative $65 million contract with Sony Music. The writer stated, "[T]here is more riding on the success of Dangerous than on any other album in pop history." Jackson personally hoped that the album would sell 100 million copies, a number that would twice surpass the sales of Thriller. Five days before the album's release, three men armed with guns robbed 30,000 copies from a Los Angeles warehouse.

Release and commercial reception 
Dangerous was released on November 26, 1991. It debuted at number one on the Billboard 200 Top Albums chart on December 14, 1991, and spent an additional three weeks there. In the first week, it sold 326,500 copies, debuting at #1. In the second week, the album remained at #1, selling 378,000 copies, a 16% increase from the previous week sales. In its third week, Dangerous sold 370,000 copies and still remained at #1. At the end of 1991, the total number of sales totalled to 1,074,500 copies sold in the United States and the album was certified platinum.  Dangerous opened the year 1992, dated January 4, remaining at #1 with 370,000 copies sold.   By January 1992, it was certified four-times platinum by the Recording Industry Association of America (RIAA) for sales of over four million copies in the United States, roughly the same number as the initial sales of Off the Wall.

Dangerous continued to sell strongly in 1992 and 1993 in the US. In 1993, following several personal and promotional appearances, album sales for Dangerous grew significantly. Following Jackson's performance at the Inauguration of U.S. President Bill Clinton, sales increased 36% and the album jumped from 131 to 88 on the week of February 6, 1993. In the next week, sales increased 83% and the album jumped to 41 following his appearance on the American Music Awards 1993 where he won 3 awards. Sales increased 40% in the following week due to the historic ratings of the Halftime Super Bowl performance and the album jumped again from 41 to 26 on the Billboard 200 selling over 29,000. On the week of February 27, 1993, album sales increased again because of the strong ratings due to the "Michael Jackson Talks ... to Oprah" TV special, selling close to 60,000 units and jumping from 26 to 12. In the following week, the album finally reentered the top 10 in the United States. As of December 1993, sales for Dangerous were around 4.8 million copies. In August 2018, the album was certified eight-times platinum by the RIAA for sales of over 8 million copies.

In Europe, it was reported that the album reached 4 million copies in shipments before it was released, becoming an all-time record at the time. It dominated global charts, debuting at number one in the U.K. while also reaching number one in twelve other territories including Australia, France, Germany, the Netherlands and Spain.

Due to the massive success of the Dangerous World Tour, album sales for Dangerous received a boost. In the first four weeks of his tour in 1992, sales of Michael Jackson's Dangerous album increased from 6.8 million to 7.2 million units in Europe.

Worldwide, the album was a massive success in fourteen countries. The album sold 5 million copies in its first week of been released outside the United States. It reached the 10 million mark in sales in the first two months after its release; Jackson's two previous albums, "Bad" and "Thriller," each took more than four months to achieve that goal.

By November 1992, the album had reportedly sold 15 million copies worldwide and was the best-selling album of that year internationally. By recent estimates, Dangerous has sold over 32 million copies worldwide making it one of the best-selling albums of all time.

Promotion 

Similar to the way in which record label executives had approached Bad, expectations were set at a high bar for Dangerous. In September 1991, Jackson netted a deal to have his videos air on FOX alongside regular music-video channels MTV, BET and VH1.

The eleven-minute video for "Black or White" debuted on November 14, 1991, and was broadcast across 27 countries. Five hundred million viewers reportedly watched it—the largest audience ever for a music video. The music video and its controversy boosted the sale of Dangerous, as did the broadcast of videos for "Remember the Time" and "In the Closet". The Dangerous: The Short Films collection of music videos from Dangerous, with behind-the-scenes footage, was released in 1993.

Jackson embarked on the Dangerous World Tour, which grossed $100 million (equivalent to $177 million in 2020) and drew nearly 4 million people across 72 concerts. All profits from the tour were donated to charities including Jackson's Heal the World Foundation. The Bucharest concert was filmed on October 1, 1992, for broadcast on HBO on October 10, 1992. Jackson sold the film rights for the concert for $20 million, then the highest amount for a concert performer to appear on television. The airing of the HBO concert special, Michael Jackson: Live in Bucharest, revived sales of the album.

Jackson made personal appearances in early 1993, including the American Music Awards and Grammy Awards, when he accepted the Grammy Legend Award from his sister Janet. He also filmed a widely discussed interview with Oprah Winfrey and made a half-time performance at the Super Bowl XXVII, which started the NFL's trend of signing top acts to appear during the Super Bowl to attract more viewers and interest. The performance helped return Dangerous to the US album chart's top ten. In August 1993, as the third leg of the Dangerous tour began, the first allegations of child sexual abuse against Jackson became public and received worldwide media attention. In November, Jackson canceled the remainder of the tour, citing health problems arising from the scandal.

Singles 
The lead single, "Black or White", was released in November 1991 and reached the top of the Billboard Hot 100 chart three weeks later it was released, staying there for seven weeks. It was the fastest chart-topper since the Beatles' "Get Back" in 1969 an the best-selling single worldwide of 1992. "Black or White" reached number one in 20 countries, including the US, the UK, Canada, Mexico, Cuba, Turkey, Zimbabwe, Australia, New Zealand, Belgium, Denmark, Finland, France, Ireland, Israel, Italy, Norway, Spain, Sweden, Switzerland and the Eurochart Hot 100.  It became the first American single to enter the UK Singles Chart at number one since "It's Now or Never" by Elvis Presley in 1960. The singles were more successful overseas than in the US. In the UK alone, seven singles reached the top ten. This set a record for any studio album in the UK until Calvin Harris surpassed it in 2013.

"Remember the Time" peaked at number three on the Billboard Hot 100 singles chart and number one on the R&B Singles Chart. It reached number one in New Zealand charts for two consecutive weeks. In the United Kingdom, the song charted at number three, where it peaked. It peaked at number four in the Netherlands and Switzerland. The song also charted within the top ten on the French, Australian, Swedish, Italian, and Norwegian charts; peaking at number five, six, eight and ten. It charted in the top 20, peaking at number 16, in Austria. It was generally well received by contemporary music critics and regarded as one of the highlight songs on Dangerous.

The album's third single, "In the Closet" peaked at number six on the Billboard Hot 100, also reached number one on the R&B Singles Chart, becoming the album's third consecutive top 10 hit. In the United Kingdom, the song charted at number eight, where it peaked. The song's female vocal was originally labeled "Mystery Girl" but was later revealed to be Princess Stéphanie of Monaco.

"Jam" only reached number 26 on the Billboard Hot 100, despite heavy promotion. The music video of the song featured NBA icon Michael Jordan. The song was played in the Chicago Bulls' 1992 NBA Championship video Untouchabulls and was used in many promotional NBA ads of that season. In the UK, the single reached the top twenty, where it peaked at number 13.

"Heal the World" peaked at number 27 on the Billboard Hot 100. The song reached number two in the UK Singles Chart in December 1992, kept off the number one position by Whitney Houston's "I Will Always Love You". In a 2001 Internet chat with fans, Jackson said "Heal the World" was the song he was most proud to have created.

"Who Is It" peaked at number 14 on the United States' Billboard Hot 100, while peaking at number six on Billboard Hot R&B/Hip-Hop Songs, as well as topping the Hot Dance Club Play. The song peaked on the United Kingdom music chart at number ten. It remained within the top 100 positions for seven consecutive weeks from July to September 1992. In France, the track peaked at number eight on August 29. "Who Is It" reached its lowest peak position at number 34 in Australia.

"Will You Be There" was the last top-10 single on the Billboard Hot 100 from the album, peaking at number seven. The song peaked at number two in New Zealand and reaching the top ten in Belgium, Canada, Ireland, the Netherlands, Switzerland and the United Kingdom. It was the theme song of the film Free Willy. Its appearance in the film also helped sales for Dangerous.

The overseas-only single "Give In to Me" reached the top five in the UK, Netherlands and Australia, while hitting the top of the charts in New Zealand.

"Gone Too Soon", another overseas single, was more moderately received, charting within the top 40 in the UK. Jackson performed the song at president-elect Bill Clinton's inauguration celebration An American Reunion: The 52nd Presidential Inaugural Gala.

Critical reception 

Dangerous received critical praise upon release. In a review for Rolling Stone, Alan Light said Jackson was "a man, no longer a man-child, confronting his well-publicized demons and achieving transcendence through performance", on an album that rose to "the impossible challenge set by Thriller during moments when Riley's production dance rhythms "prove a perfect match for Jackson's clipped, breathy uptempo voice".

Robert Christgau of The Village Voice deemed it Jackson's "most consistent album since Off the Wall, a step up from Bad even if its hook craft is invariably secondary and its vocal mannerisms occasionally annoying." While he felt Jackson was too insistent with the "faith-hope-and-charity" message songs, Christgau applauded the production's "abrasively unpredictable" rhythms and the "sex-and-romance" songs, calling them the most plausible of Jackson's career.

Jon Pareles was less receptive in The New York Times, calling it Jackson's "least confident" solo album yet. He believed Jackson sounded anxious and out of place with Riley's electronic beats while panning the "dogmatically ordinary" lyrics of the love songs, writing that "they seem based on demographic research rather than experience or imagination". Chris Willman, writing for the Los Angeles Times, said, on the album, Jackson wanted to transcend all demographics—race, age, nationality—and be a role model for children and a bad cat at the same time. The album was "mostly good, expertly made fun" but far from Jackson's best work. Willman also criticized "Heal the World" as "goofily embarrassing" and "venturing into the realm of self-parody".

Dangerous received four Grammy Award nominations including three for Jackson: Best Pop Vocal Performance for "Black or White", and Best R&B Vocal Performance and Best R&B Song for "Jam". Teddy Riley and Bruce Swedien won Best Engineered Album, Non Classical, while Jackson received the Grammy Legend Award in the same ceremony. Jackson won two awards and received five nominations total at the 1993 American Music Awards. Dangerous won Favorite Pop/Rock Album, and "Remember the Time" won Favorite Soul/R&B Song. The inaugural International Artist Award also went to Jackson.

Jackson won Best R&B/Soul Album of the Year – Male and Best R&B/Soul Single – Male for "Remember the Time" at the 1993 Soul Train Music Awards. He also won the special Humanitarian Award. At the 1993 NAACP Image Awards, "Black or White" won Outstanding Music Video, and Jackson won the Entertainer of the Year Award. At the 1994 MTV Movie Awards, "Will You Be There" won Best Song From a Movie. The 1992 Billboard Music Awards awarded Jackson Best Worldwide Album for the album and Best Worldwide Single for "Black or White". Both were special awards.

Legacy and influence

Reappraisal 
An influence on contemporary pop and R&B artists, Dangerous has been ranked by critics and publications as one of the greatest albums of all time. While the sounds on the album polarized critics, some have considered Dangerous as Jackson's artistic peak. Jeff Weiss called it "Jackson’s final classic album and the best full-length of the New Jack Swing era." Critic Joseph Vogel described the album as Jackson's most socially conscious record, most personally revealing—similar to Stevie Wonder's Songs in the Key of Life—and the most groundbreaking record of its era. He added "Dangerous is gaining admirers as more people move beyond the extraneous nonsense that was so prominent in contemporaneous reviews and pay attention to its content: its prescient themes, its vast inventory of sounds, its panoramic survey of musical styles...His R&B-rap fusions set the blueprint for years to come, while his industrial soundscapes and metallic beats were later popularized by artists as disparate as Nine Inch Nails and Lady Gaga". Writing for The Guardian in 2018, the critic said, "Returning to [Dangerous] now, without the hype or biases that accompanied its release in the early 90s, one gets a clearer sense of its significance [...] it surveyed the cultural scene—and the internal anguish of its creator—in compelling ways [...]. The contemporary music scene is certainly far more indebted to Dangerous". Vogel also credited the album as a significant factor to the transformation of black music. Ben Beaumont-Thomas deemed Dangerous as Jackson's career-high album, "the very peak of his powers, with his widest ever emotional range set to production that makes new jack swing seem much more than just lame dance moves and fluorescent man-made fibers." Stephen Thomas Erlewine also praised Jackson's brave approach in the album, that it was "a much sharper, riskier album" than Bad.

Speaking for the Rock and Roll Hall of Fame, Janet Macoska applauded the modernity of Dangerous: "a sleek, contemporary-sounding update of Jackson's music" which featured the "ambitious, heartfelt anthems "Heal The World" and "Will You Be There." Similarly, Odyssey critic James Wesser said, "[Dangerous], in my opinion, is timeless and if it was re-released in the year 2016, it will still sound fresh and new." Michael Roffman of Consequence of Sound described the album as "Jackson's 90s masterpiece." Scholar Susan Fast thought of Dangerous as Jackson's coming-of-age album: “[The album] offers a compelling narrative arc of postmodern angst, love, lust, seduction, betrayal, damnation, and above all else racial politics, in ways heretofore unseen in his music." Meanwhile, Tari Ngangura of Vice magazine described it as one of the "greatest introspective albums of all time." Todd "Stereo" Williams of The Boombox said the album was Jackson's "blackest album" since Off the Wall—a return to his roots. He highlighted the cultural references in the music video "Black or White," the all black cast and black director for "Remember the Time," the casting of black supermodel Naomi Campbell as the love interest in "In the Closet" and working with Teddy Riley who was "R&B's biggest hit-maker" at the time. Williams also considered the album as a significant record of the 90s; it asserted Jackson as a formidable force in popular music amid the rise of grunge and gangsta rap.

Rankings 
In 2007, the National Association of Recording Merchandisers (NARM), in conjunction with the Rock and Roll Hall of Fame, ranked Dangerous at number 115 on its list of the Definitive 200 Albums of All Time. In Spin's list of The 300 Best Albums of the Past 30 Years (1985–2014), the album was ranked at number 132. Spin writer Chuck Eddy named it one of the essential new jack swing albums in a list published by the magazine. In Colin Larkin's third edition of the All Time Top 1000 Albums (2000), Dangerous was ranked number 325. Additionally, it was ranked number 13 in the list of the Soul/R&B – All Time Top 50 albums. Dangerous was ranked number 43 in Billboard's list of the Greatest of All Time R&B/Hip-Hop Albums, out of 100 albums. In 2019, 24/7 Wall St. ranked it number 89 in its list of the 100 Best Pop Albums of All Time.

Accolades

Track listing 
Credits adapted from the album's CD booklet

Notes
  signifies a co-producer

Personnel 
Personnel as listed in the album's liner notes.

 John Bahler – vocal and choir arrangements 
 The John Bahler Singers – choir 
 Glen Ballard – arrangements 
 John Barnes – keyboards 
 Michael Boddicker – synthesizer , sequencer , keyboards and programming 
 Craig Brock – assistant guitar engineer 
 Brad Buxer – keyboards , synthesizer , percussion , programming 
 Larry Corbett – cello 
 Andraé Crouch – choir arrangements 
 Sandra Crouch – choir arrangements 
 The Andraé Crouch Singers – choir 
 Heavy D – rap 
 George Del Barrio – string arrangements 
 Matt Forger – engineer and mixing , engineering and sound design 
 Kevin Gilbert – speed sequencer 
 Endre Granat – concertmaster 
 Linda Harmon – soprano voice 
 Jerry Hey – arrangements 
 Jean-Marie Horvat – engineer 
 Michael Jackson – producer and lead vocals , background vocals , arrangements , vocal arrangements , rhythm arrangements , director , soprano voice 
 Paul Jackson Jr. – guitar 
 Terry Jackson – bass guitar 
 Louis Johnson – bass guitar 
 Abraham Laboriel – bass guitar 
 Christa Larson – ending solo vocal 
 Rhett Lawrence – synthesizer ; drums, percussion, and arrangements ; synthesizer programming 
 Bryan Loren – drums , synthesizer 
 Johnny Mandel – orchestral arrangements and conductor 
 Jasun Martz – keyboards 
 Andres McKenzie – intro voice-over 
 Jim Mitchell – guitar engineer 
 René Moore – arrangements and keyboards 
 David Paich – keyboards , synthesizer , keyboard arrangements and programming , rhythm arrangements 
 Marty Paich – orchestral arrangements and conductor 
 Greg Phillinganes – keyboards 
 Tim Pierce – heavy metal guitar 
 Jeff Porcaro – drums 
 Steve Porcaro – synthesizer , keyboards and programming 
 Teddy Riley – producer, engineer, mixing, and synthesizers ; keyboards ; guitar ; rhythm arrangements ; synthesizer arrangements ; drums and arrangements 
 Thom Russo – engineer 
 Slash – special guitar performance 
 Bruce Swedien – producer , co-producer , engineer and mixing , arrangements and keyboards , drums , percussion 
 Jai Winding – keyboards and programming , piano and bass guitar 
 Mystery Girl  – vocals

Charts

Weekly charts

Year-end charts

Decade-end charts

Certifications and sales

See also 

 Dangerous World Tour
 Live in Bucharest: The Dangerous Tour
 Dangerous – The Short Films
 List of best-selling albums
 List of best-selling albums by country
 List of best-selling albums in Australia
 List of best-selling albums in Chile
 List of best-selling albums in Europe
 List of best-selling albums in France
 List of best-selling albums in Germany
 List of best-selling albums in Indonesia
 List of best-selling albums in Italy
 List of best-selling albums in Mexico
 List of best-selling albums in Taiwan
 List of number-one albums of 1991 (U.S.)
 List of number-one albums of 1992 (U.S.)
 List of number-one R&B albums of 1992 (U.S.)

References

Footnotes

Works cited

External links
 

1991 albums
Michael Jackson albums
Epic Records albums
Albums produced by Michael Jackson
Albums produced by Bill Bottrell
Albums produced by Teddy Riley
Albums recorded at United Western Recorders
Albums recorded at Westlake Recording Studios
Albums with cover art by Mark Ryden
Grammy Award for Best Engineered Album, Non-Classical